Andrew Hermann (born February 25, 1971) is an American racewalker.

Hermann was born in Newport, Oregon. He finished 31st at the 2000 Summer Olympics in Sydney, in the men's 50 kilometres walk. He competed at the 1997 and 1999 World Championships but was disqualified, and did not finish at the 1994 Goodwill Games.

References

External links

1971 births
Living people
American male racewalkers
Olympic track and field athletes of the United States
Athletes (track and field) at the 2000 Summer Olympics
People from Newport, Oregon
Track and field athletes from Oregon
World Athletics Championships athletes for the United States
Competitors at the 1994 Goodwill Games